Virginia's 48th House of Delegates district elects one of 100 seats in the lower house of the state's bicameral legislature, the General Assembly. District 48 represents parts of Arlington and Fairfax counties. The seat is currently held by Democrat Rip Sullivan.

List of delegates

References

Virginia House of Delegates districts
Arlington County, Virginia
Government in Fairfax County, Virginia